The following is a list of events affecting Argentine television in 2017.

Debuts
 Amar después de amar (Telefe) - Jan 23, 2017
 Quiero vivir a tu lado (El Trece) - Jan 23, 2017

References